The Deer River is a  long tributary of the Black River, in Lewis County, New York, in the United States.

See also
List of rivers of New York

References

Rivers of New York (state)